Antônio Carlos Gueiros Ribeiro known as Badalhoca (born October 5, 1957) is a Brazilian former volleyball player who competed in the 1980 Summer Olympics and in the 1984 Summer Olympics.

In 1980 he was part of the Brazilian team which finished fifth in the Olympic tournament. He played two matches.

Four years later he won the silver medal with the Brazilian team in the 1984 Olympic tournament. He played five matches.

External links
 profile

1957 births
Living people
Volleyball players from Rio de Janeiro (city)
Brazilian men's volleyball players
Olympic volleyball players of Brazil
Volleyball players at the 1980 Summer Olympics
Volleyball players at the 1984 Summer Olympics
Olympic silver medalists for Brazil
Olympic medalists in volleyball
Medalists at the 1984 Summer Olympics
Pan American Games medalists in volleyball
Pan American Games silver medalists for Brazil
Pan American Games gold medalists for Brazil
Medalists at the 1979 Pan American Games
Medalists at the 1983 Pan American Games